F.U: Friendship Unlimited  is a 2017 Marathi-language Romantic comedy-drama film starring Akash Thosar, Vaidehi Parashurami, Sanskruti Balgude, Satya Manjrekar, and Mayuresh Pem. It is produced and directed by Mahesh Manjrekar, for T-Series Films,Cut2Cut Movies, and Mahesh Manjrekar Movies.

Cast
Akash Thosar
Vaidehi Parashurami
Satya Manjrekar
Shubham Kirodian
Mayuresh Pem
Nitesh Kalbande
Sanskruti Balgude
Isha Koppikar
Boman Irani
Mahesh Manjrekar
Medha Manjrekar
Chetan Hansraj
Kashmera Shah
Anand Ingle
Bharti Achrekar
Madhav Deochake
Sharad Ponkshe
Sachin Khedekar
Ashwini Ekbote
Radhika Vidyasagar
Pawandeep Rajan

Soundtrack
All Marathi songs Album released on T-Series & Saregama music The song is music composer by Vishal Mishra and Sameer Saptiskar

Reception

References

External links

T-Series (company) films
2017 films
2010s Marathi-language films
Indian comedy films
2017 comedy films
Films directed by Mahesh Manjrekar